Jimmy Connors was the defending champion but lost in the quarterfinals to Harold Solomon.

John Alexander won in the final 2–6, 6–4, 6–4 against Manuel Orantes.

Seeds

  Jimmy Connors (quarterfinals)
  Brian Gottfried (quarterfinals)
  Raúl Ramírez (second round)
  Manuel Orantes (final)
  Stan Smith (second round)
  Ken Rosewall (quarterfinals)
  Harold Solomon (semifinals)
  Eddie Dibbs (semifinals)

Draw

Finals

Top half

Section 1

Section 2

Bottom half

Section 3

Section 4

External links
 1977 Volvo International draw 

Singles